China Aerospace International Holdings Limited (abb. CASIL) is a Hong Kong incorporated holding company. The company itself is a subsidiary of China Aerospace Science and Technology Corporation and a listed company on the Stock Exchange of Hong Kong. It is a red chip company, but not part of the "red chip index" of the stock exchange.

The holding company in the past was involved in electronic goods as well as their plastic components; since acquired by stated-owned China Aerospace Science and Technology Corporation, according to the company, it became a conglomerate that involved in manufacturing and sale of hi-tech products, as well as property investment.

History

Conic Investment
China Aerospace International Holdings Ltd. was previously known as Conic Investment Co., Ltd.. It was incorporated on 25 July 1975 in British Hong Kong. It was acted as the holding company of Conic Group, which including Cony Electronic Products (incorporated in 1973), Chee Yuen Industrial Company (incorporated in 1969 and was majority owned by Alex Au), Far East United Electronics (incorporated in 1970), Grand Precision Works,  Electric Company, Hong Yuen Electronics, Soundic Electronics, as well as other electronic and plastic manufacturers. Conic Investment also owned the brand Contec.

[the larger] Conic Group also had a film production company, Conic Film Productions Limited that was incorporated in October 1979.  signed a contract to publish the album of Sam Hui in 1984. The audio department of the [larger] Conic Group, which publish albums for aforementioned Sam Hui, as well as Michael Kwan and Paula Tsui, was operated by Contec Sound Media Limited (incorporated in April 1981) according to other news report. The larger Conic Group also had a TV studio called Conic TV Studio, which was now known as Centro TV, a predecessor of Centro Digital Pictures. Conic TV was led by Robert Chua and John Chu; Chu later bought the company from [the larger] Conic Group. A sister company, Conic Video Club, was opened in 1982.

In 1980, Conic Investment was already one of the largest electronic manufacturer in Hong Kong. In November 1980, Conic Investment signed a land lease with a government-owned corporation, Hong Kong Industrial Estates Corporation, in order to open a CRT television factory in the Tai Po Industrial Estate. Conic Investment also invested in the mainland China shortly after the marketisation, which a Sino-foreign joint venture repairing factory in Fuzhou, for Conic and Contec branded products, was opened in April 1980.

It became a listed company on the Hong Kong stock exchange on 25 August 1981. The listed company received half of the former Conic Group, while some of the former subsidiaries remained private, under another holding company Honic Holdings, which was incorporated on 18 December 1979. Conic TV, Conic Film Productions, Contec Sound Media, Conic Video Club, Grand Precision Works, Soundic Electronics, as well as Conic Semiconductor, etc. were remained private.

In 1983, Conic Investment purchased Conic Investment Building from the developer Cheung Kong Holdings, by paying HK$53.3 million cash and issuing new shares worth HK$56.7 million (HK$2.1 per share) to Cheung Kong, that equal to 7.2% of the original share capital according to news report. The building became the headquarter of Conic Investment. In February 1983, Conic Semiconductor, was acquired from Honic, the unlisted portion of the larger Conic Group, for HK$55 million cash. The subsidiary was the largest producer of liquid-crystal display panel in Hong Kong according to the narrative of the company.

However, in 1982, in order to cover a financial loss, Alex Au (Au Yan Din), chairman and the majority shareholder of Conic Investment at that time, invited Chinese state-owned enterprise (SOE) China Resources to subscribe a capital increase of the company (which an agreement was signed in January 1984 for 100 million number of new shares for HK$1 each), via a subsidiary Sin King Enterprises Company Limited, as well as purchase 80 million number of shares from Au. After the completion of the capital increase, China Resources and Bank of China Group (at that time as unincorporated group of companies) became the controlling shareholder in 1984 for 35% ordinary shares via Sin King. Conic at that time declared that the company did not faced any difficulties, thus the takeover was not related to the situation of the company. However, Alex Au and 5 other directors were resigned and replaced by directors that were nominated by Sin King shortly after the takeover. A scandal that involves false accounting as well as illegal withdrew of the capital of the listed company was also reveal in 1984–85, with 2 of the resigned directors Tam Chun Shing and Lam Chun Kiu, as well as 7 managers were arrested. It was also reported that Alex Au was fled to Taiwan in 1984, who refused to refurbish the loan of Honic from Conic. Au also involved in a kidnapping crime in 1985 which he was reportly kidnapped his new business partner. Lam Chun Kiu later also founded his own electronics company, including a joint venture that now known as Konka Group.

Since then, Conic Investment was shifted its focus to the mainland China under the new owner. Sin King also attempted to privatise and delist the company in 1987. However, the plan was abandoned in the same year. It was revealed that the company had a heavy net loss in 1986 financial year.

China Aerospace International Holdings
In 1993 Conic Investment was acquired by fellow SOE China Aerospace Science and Technology Corporation (CASC) as a backdoor listing, renaming to China Aerospace International Holdings Limited. The English name of the company was remained unchanged since 1993, but the Chinese name had changed to the current one in 2008. Some of the subsidiaries of former Conic Investment remained intact as live subsidiaries, although the economic transformation of Hong Kong had made most of the factories of the group were shifted to mainland China.

In 2000, the Stock Exchange of Hong Kong publicly criticised four (former) directors of CASIL for not disclosing related-parties deals of CASIL and CASC properly, as well as disclosing the deals with XCOM Multimedia Communications, a company that owned a stake in CASIL's joint venture CXSAT. XCOM Multimedia Communications and CXSAT were makers of digital satellite receiver decoder.

In 2005, the company sold the former headquarter Conic Investment Building which was located in Hung Hom to Global Coin Limited, a subsidiary Cheung Kong Holdings, for HK$330 million.

The company also owned 14.29% shares of APT Satellite International (via a subsidiary CASIL Satellite), the parent company of listed company APT Satellite Holdings, the operator Apstar satellites. CASIL Satellite was sold to CASIL's parent company CASC in 2011 for HK$132.3 million.

In 2014, Li Guolei, a director of CASIL's subsidiary China Aerospace Industrial Limited, committed suicide by jumping off from China Aerospace Centre, Kwun Tong. According to his wife, he was under investigation for corruption by mainland Chinese authorities.

CASIL had a joint venture, Hainan Aerospace Investment Management, which was a developer of the complex zone of Wenchang Spacecraft Launch Site. However, the joint venture withdrew from the development in 2016. It was reported the complex would be developed into a theme park.

Subsidiaries

current
 CASIL Semiconductor [(); formerly known as Conic Semiconductor] (100%)
 CASIL Electronic Products [(); formerly known as Cony Electronic Products] (100%)
 Chee Yuen Industrial Company [()] (100%)
  Electric Company [()] (100%)
  Electronics Company [(), formerly known as Far East United Electronics] (100%)
 Hong Yuen Electronics [()] (100%)
former
 CASIL Satellite (100%)
 CASIL Telecommunications

former, Conic era
 Bony Electronics (100%) [(), dissolved]
 Contec Electronics, Inc. (80%) [incorporated in the United States]
 Hop Cheong Plastic Manufactory (100%) [(), dissolved]
 Hung Nien Electronics (100%) [(), dissolved]
 Jecko Electronics (100%) [( or ), dissolved]
 Jeckwell Electronics (100%) [(), dissolved]

Joint ventures
former
 Xiamen Overseas Chinese Electronic Company [()] (50%)

Shareholders

See also
 , former known as Telefield International (Holdings), a former electronic company that was founded by a former employee of Conic Investment, Cheng Han Ngok (Steve Cheng)
 APT Satellite Holdings, sister company in Hong Kong
 China Energine, sister company in Hong Kong

Further reading
 Atari Incorporated and others v. Soundic Electronics Ltd and others (case law)

Footnotes

References

External links
  

Companies listed on the Hong Kong Stock Exchange
Holding companies established in 1975
1975 establishments in Hong Kong
Holding companies of Hong Kong
Electronics companies of China
Electronics companies of Hong Kong
Real estate companies of China
China Resources